William Graham Sesler (April 18, 1928 – May 22, 2017) was a former Democratic member of the Pennsylvania State Senate, serving from 1961 to 1972. He was an unsuccessful candidate in the 1970 United States Senate election in Pennsylvania against Hugh Scott.

Biography
Born in 1928 to Frederick A. Sesler and Pauline Dixson, Sesler was the youngest of three boys, an older brother, Frederick D. Sesler, and a twin, Thomas R. Sesler. He went to Academy High School.

He attended Kenyon College and joined the United States Air Force during the Korean War. He became a first lieutenant. After serving in the Air Force, he went to University of Michigan Law School.

William worked as an attorney with the firm Sesler & Sesler. He died on May 22, 2017.

References

1928 births
2017 deaths
People from Uniontown, Pennsylvania
American Presbyterians
Pennsylvania lawyers
United States Air Force officers
Kenyon College alumni
University of Michigan Law School alumni
Politicians from Erie, Pennsylvania
Democratic Party Pennsylvania state senators
20th-century American lawyers
Military personnel from Pennsylvania